Benning is a surname or, less frequently, a forename.

People whose surname is Benning
Achim Benning (born 1935), German actor and director
Anton Benning (1918–2013), German World War II flying ace
Brian Benning (born 1966), retired Canadian ice hockey player
Christine Benning (born 1955), English middle-distance runner
Clement Pitt Benning (1785–1865), Canadian merchant and magistrate
Dave Benning, retired Canadian soccer player and coach
Denise Benning (born 1967), former Canadian figure skater
Frank Benning, Australian rugby league player and administrator
Henry Arthur Benning (1879–1962), American vice-president and general manager of the Amalgamated Sugar Company
Henry L. Benning (1814–1875), Confederate general, lawyer and legislator
James Benning (cricketer) (born 1983), English cricketer
James Benning (film director) (born 1942), American film director
Jim Benning (born 1963), retired Canadian ice hockey player
Joe Benning (born 1956), American politician
Mal Benning (born 1993), English footballer
Mark Benning (born 1964), Canadian ice hockey player
Matt Benning (born 1994), Canadian ice hockey player
Micky Benning (born 1938), English footballer
Norm Benning (born 1952), American NASCAR owner/driver
Osla Benning (1921–1974), Canadian debutante who worked at Bletchley Park
Sadie Benning (born 1973), American musician and visual artist
Sheri Benning, Canadian writer from Saskatchewan, Canada
Sybille Benning (1961–2022), German politician

People whose forename is Benning
Benning M. Bean (1782–1866), American farmer and politician
Benning W. Jenness (1806–1879), American politician
Benning Potoa'e (born 1996), American football player
Benning Wentworth (1696–1770), British politician

See also
Bening
Benningen
Brenning